The 1st constituency of Baranya County is one of the single member constituencies of the National Assembly, the national legislature of Hungary. The constituency standard abbreviation: Baranya 01. OEVK.

Since 2018, it has been represented by Tamás Mellár of the Dialogue for Hungary party.

Geography
The 1st constituency is located in central part of Baranya County.

List of municipalities
The constituency includes the following municipalities:

Members
The constituency was first represented by Péter Csizi of the Fidesz from 2014 to 2018. An Independent politician Tamás Mellár was elected in 2018. After this election he joined the Dialogue for Hungary party and he was re-elected in 2022 (with United for Hungary support).

Notes

References

Baranya 1st